Diamond Jubilee Higher Secondary School (DJHSS) is a boys-only secondary school in Gobichettipalayam, in the Erode District of Tamil Nadu, India. It was established to commemorate the Diamond Jubilee celebrations of Queen Victoria in 1898.

About the School
DJHSS has about 1700 students and 65 staff. It is a government aided school largely funded by the Tamil Nadu State Government, which pays the teachers' salaries. This enables the school to serve the educational requirements of the needy by offering education for a nominal fee. English medium curriculum was introduced in the year 1976. Mahatma Gandhi visited the school during the year 1927.

Gallery

Notable alumni
 Verghese Kurien, Father of the White Revolution, founder of AMUL, founder of the Gujarat Co-operative Milk Marketing Federation (GCMMF)

References

External links
School Web Page
Alumni web page

Boys' schools in India
High schools and secondary schools in Tamil Nadu
Schools in Erode district
Education in Gobichettipalayam
Educational institutions established in 1898
1898 establishments in India